The 1896 Illinois Fighting Illini football team was an American football team that represented the University of Illinois during the 1896 Western Conference football season.  In their second season under head coach George Huff, the Illini compiled a 4–2–1 record and finished in a tie for last place in the inaugural season of the Western Conference. Guard Charles D. Beebe was the team captain.

Schedule

Roster

Source: University of Illinois

References

Illinois
Illinois Fighting Illini football seasons
Illinois Fighting Illini football